Cortinarius atroviolaceus is a fungus native to Borneo, where it was originally collected by E.J.H. Corner on the slopes of Mount Kinabalu in 1964 and described by Meinhard Michael Moser in 1986. Specimens from New Zealand classified as this species are probably a different species. It is poorly known.

The mushroom is wholly dark purple with slightly paler flesh, and resembles Cortinarius violaceus though is smaller.

See also
List of Cortinarius species

References

atroviolaceus
Fungi described in 1986
Fungi of Malaysia